Abdulrahman Rashid (Arabic:عبد الرحمن راشد) (born 30 April 1998) is a Qatari footballer. He currently plays as a midfielder for Lusail.

Career

Al-Duhail
Abdulrahman Rashid started his career at Al-Duhail and is a product of the Al-Duhail's youth system.

Al-Shahania
In the summer of 2018 he left Al-Duhail and signed with Al-Shahania. On 22 August 2019, Abdulrahman Rashid made his professional debut for Al-Shahania against Al-Gharafa in the Pro League, replacing Mustafa Jalal.

External links

References

Living people
1998 births
Qatari footballers
Al-Duhail SC players
Al-Shahania SC players
Lusail SC players
Qatar Stars League players
Qatari Second Division players
Association football midfielders
Place of birth missing (living people)